Coria was a fort and town  south of Hadrian's Wall, in the Roman province of Britannia at a point where a big Roman north–south road (Dere Street) bridged the River Tyne and met another Roman road (Stanegate), which ran east–west between Coria and Luguvalium (the modern Carlisle) in the Solway Plain. The full Latin name is uncertain. In English, it is known as Corchester or Corbridge Roman Site as it sits on the edge of the village of Corbridge in the English county of Northumberland. It is in the guardianship of English Heritage and is partially exposed as a visitor attraction, including a site museum.

Name
The place-name appears in contemporary records as Corstopitum and Corie Lopocarium. These forms are generally recognised as corrupt. Suggested reconstructions include Coriosopitum, Corsopitum or Corsobetum. The Vindolanda tablets show that it was locally referred to by the simple form, Coria, the name for a local tribal centre. The suffix ought to represent the name of the local tribe, a member of the Brigantian confederation but its correct form is unknown. It gave its name to Corbridge, albeit by processes which are debated.

Early occupation
There is evidence of Iron Age round houses on the site but the first Romans in the area built the Red House Fort,  to the west, as a supply camp for Agricola's campaigns.

Forts

Soon after Roman victories in modern Scotland, around AD 84, a new fort was built on the site with turf ramparts and timber gates. Barrack blocks surrounded a headquarters building, a commander's residence, administrative staff accommodation, workshops and granaries. It was probably occupied by a 500-strong cavalry unit called the Ala Gallorum Petriana but burnt down in AD 105. A second timber fort was built, guarding an important crossing of the River Tyne, when the Solway Firth–Tyne divide was the Roman frontier. Around AD 120, when Hadrian's Wall was built just over two miles to the north, the fort was rebuilt again, probably to house infantry away from the Wall. About twenty years later, when the frontier was pushed further north and the Antonine Wall built, the first stone fort was erected under the Governor Quintus Lollius Urbicus.

English Heritage has released monographs on the forts along Hadrian's Wall through the Archaeology Data Service. Bishop and Dore's report on the excavations at Corbridge 1947–80 reveal the complex history of the sequence of mainly earth and timber forts which preceded the masonry buildings.(available here) The reports also cover a metal hoard found within the fort, possibly linked to the abandonment between AD 122 and 138 (also available on the Archaeology Data Service website).

Town development

After the Romans fell back to Hadrian's Wall in AD 163, the army seems to have been largely removed from Coria. Its ramparts were levelled and a big rebuilding programme of a very different nature was instigated. A series of probable temples were erected, followed by granaries, a fountain house and a large courtyard complex, which may have been intended to become a civilian forum or a military storehouse and workshop establishment. It was never finished in its original plan.

Burnt timber buildings may relate to Cassius Dio's reference to tribes crossing the frontier but by the early 3rd century there was more construction. Two compounds opposite the supposed forum were built as part of a military supply depot within the town. It was connected with the Second and the Sixth Legion and may have been part of the supply network for Septimius Severus' northern campaigns.

Information on the 3rd- and 4th-century town is lacking but an elaborate house was certainly put up which may have housed an Imperial official. Coria was probably a big market centre for the lead, iron and coal industries in the area, as well as agriculture, evidenced by the granaries. A pottery store has also been identified. When occupation came to an end is unclear. It is not even known if the site was still occupied when the Anglo-Saxons arrived to found adjoining Corbridge.

The Corbridge Hoard was found here.

Rediscovery
Between 1906 and 1914, the site was excavated following a desire by the Northumberland County History Committee to assess the Roman remains at Corbridge ahead of a book on the history of the parish, overseen by Francis J. Haverfield. During that time, a number of scholars from Oxford University were sent by Haverfield to supervise local labourers tasked with the actual excavation, including J.P. Bushe-Fox and Leonard Woolley, making it one of the first training excavations in British archaeology. Brian Dobson later ran adult training excavations at Corbridge in the 1960s and 1970s.

Tombstone of Flavinus, Roman Standard Bearer

Work on Hexham Abbey in 1881 brought to light a Roman funerary monument in the stonework of the south porch of the transept. An elaborately carved stone (now on display in the abbey) shows a standard-bearer in the Roman cavalry riding down a barbarian: its inscription shows it to commemorate Flavinus, an officer in the ala Petriana who died aged 25 after seven years' service. The ala Petriana is known to have been stationed at Corbridge, and the slab is thought to date to the late first century and to have once stood in the military cemetery near the fort there.

In fiction 
In Rosemary Sutcliff's 1965 novel The Mark of the Horse Lord, the lead character is a gladiator in Corstopitum before he leaves to join the Dal Riata north of the Antonine Wall.
In Mary Stewart's 1979 novel The Last Enchantment, Merlin and Ulfin pass through Cor Bridge on their way to spy on Morgause and Lot of Lothian in Dunpeldyr (Traprain Law near Dunbar, East Lothian).
In Juliet Landon's 2006 historical romance The Warlord's Mistress, it is 208 AD and a beautiful spy from one of the Celtic tribes holding out against Roman rule is living in Coria, where she meets one of the Roman rulers.
In Ruth Downie's 2008 novel, Terra Incognita, the protagonists find themselves near Coria as the action opens.
In László Krasznahorkai's Man Booker International Prize-winning novel War and War, Corstopitum features as one of the sites visited by four mysterious travellers in a manuscript discovered by Korin, the central character of the novel.

References

External links
 
  English Heritage web page on Corbridge Roman Site
  Teachers' resource pack: English Heritage Handling Collection
 M. Bishop, J. Dore:  Corbridge. Excavations of the Roman fort and town, 1947-80
 Tony Wilmott: Hadrian's Wall. Archaeological research by English Heritage 1976-2000
 Haverfield, F, ‘An account of the Roman remains in the parish of Corbridge’, in A History of Northumberland, vol 10, ed HHE Craster (Newcastle upon Tyne and London, 1914), 455–522
  Roman Britain page on Corbridge Roman Site

Roman towns and cities in England
Roman sites in Northumberland
Forts of Hadrian's Wall
English Heritage sites in Northumberland
History of Northumberland
Former populated places in Northumberland
Museums in Northumberland
Museums of ancient Rome in the United Kingdom
Archaeological museums in England
Roman auxiliary forts in England
Corbridge